is a railway station in Kōryō, Nara, Japan, serving passengers traveling on Kintetsu Railway's Tawaramoto Line. It is 4.5 km (2.8 mi) from Nishi-Tawaramoto, while 5.6 km (3.5 miles) from Shin-Ōji.

Lines 
 Kintetsu Railway
 Tawaramoto Line

Platforms and tracks

Surrounding 
 Gyōkyō-ji Temple (Hashio Gobō)
 Nara Prefecture 2nd Purification Center
 Nara Prefectural Yamato-Koryo Senior High School

External links
 

Railway stations in Japan opened in 1918
Railway stations in Nara Prefecture